Melanie Jones  (born 11 August 1972, Barnstaple, Devon, England) is an English-born Australian cricket commentator and former cricketer who represented Australia women's national cricket team.

Early life
Jones was born in England and moved with her mother to Melbourne, Australia when she was three months old. Her father, a West Indian, stayed back in England and she did not meet him until the age of 16. However, he had a big influence on her early life, particularly in attracting her to cricket.  She was introduced to cricket by her high school geography teacher (the father of Australian Test player Peter Handscomb).

Playing career
A right-handed batter and occasional right-arm medium pace bowler, she played 5 Test matches for Australia between 1998 and 2003, scoring 251 runs, highlighted by a 131 on debut against England in August 1998. Jones was the 134th woman to play Test cricket for Australia. She has also played 61 One Day Internationals for Australia, scoring 1028 runs with an average in the low-twenties.

Jones played limited overs cricket in England for the now defunct Lancashire and Cheshire Women cricket team between 1994 and 1997 and the Surrey County women's cricket team between 2003 and 2004. She played 122 games for the Victorian Spirit in the Australian Women's National Cricket League, and then five Women's Twenty20 cricket games for the Tasmanian Roar.

Commentary career
Cricket Australia put Jones' name forward in 2007 to commentate on the women's Twenty20 international, covered by Australia's Channel 9.  Since then, Jones has commentated on women's internationals covered by Channel 9, as well as providing commentary for men's and women's games on ABC Radio.

In 2015, Jones was announced as one of four female commentators to commentate on the 2015 Indian Premier League.  Later in 2015, Jones joined the Channel 10 coverage of inaugural season of the Women's Big Bash League, and also provided boundary commentary during the 2015-16 Big Bash League, along with boundary commentary for Pakistan Super League 2017. She also lent her voice to the Ashes Cricket 17 game.

In May 2018, she signed with Fox Sports.
During the 2020/2021 summer of cricket, She commentated the WBBL and Women's International Cricket with Channel 7

Personal life
Outside of cricket, Jones works for a sports management company.

Jones has worked as an ambassador with Australian charity, Red Dust, which promotes health initiatives in remote Aboriginal communities. In 2017 Jones was inducted to the Victorian Honour Roll of Women, while in the 2019 Australia Day Honours, Jones was awarded the Order of Australia Medal, for services to cricket and the community.

References

External links
 
 

1972 births
Living people
Australian people of Caribbean descent
Australia women Test cricketers
Recipients of the Medal of the Order of Australia
Australia women One Day International cricketers
Women cricketers who made a century on Test debut
English emigrants to Australia
Sportspeople from Barnstaple
Australian cricket commentators
Women cricket commentators